DG Vaishnav College (Dwaraka Doss Goverdhan Doss Vaishnav College), commonly known as DDGDVC, is a Liberal arts, commerce and science college in Chennai, India. It is an autonomous institution affiliated with the University of Madras. It is located in the Arumbakkam locality of Chennai, which is a hub for many shops and markets, of which the most famous Koyembedu market and bus stand. It was recently reaccredited by NAAC with A++ grade ( CGPA of 3.54 /4) in 3rd cycle.

The College
The College now has 7 UG and 6 PG (Aided), 12 UG and 11 PG (Self-Supporting) programmes. Research Programmes such as M.Phil, (Commerce, Economics, Chemistry and Mathematics ) and Ph.D. (Commerce, Economics, Chemistry and Computers) has become part of the academic curriculum.

Autonomy
The College has been conferred the status of "AUTONOMY" by the UGC and endorsed by the University of Madras from the academic year 2009 - 2010. Consequently, students admitted to various UG, PG and M.Phil courses during the academic year 2009 - 2010 will come under Autonomous pattern. The current batch of IInd Year & IIIrd Year UG Students and IInd Year PG Students will continue under affiliated mode. presently the extension of Autonomy was given by the UGC upto 2032-2033.

Academics
DG Vaishnav College was affiliated to the University of Madras, however the College has been conferred the status of "AUTONOMY" by the UGC and endorsed by the University of Madras from the academic year 2009 - 2010. Consequently, students admitted to various UG, PG and M.Phil courses during the academic year 2009 - 2010 will come under Autonomous pattern. The extension of autonomy was given by the UGC upto 2032-2033.

National Social Service
There are five NSS units of which one is exclusively for the girl students.

National Cadet Corps 
National Cadet Corps (NCC) in this college has two Army wing
1[TN] ARMOURED SQUADRON NCC
1 [TN] BATTALION NCC

Courses offered
UG Courses

PG Courses

Notable alumni 

 Mohan Kumar Raja, Sprinter, RIO Olympics
 Kush KumarGold Medallist India at the 2014 Asian Games
 K. V. Anand, Film Director
 Karthik (singer), Playback Singer
 Ajay Rathnam, Actor
 P. Ravindhranath, Politician
 Neyveli Santhanagopalan, Carnatic Singer
 Jithan Ramesh, Actor 
 Preetha, Television Personality
 Venu Arvind, Actor
 Venkatesh Harinathan, Actor
 Shakthi Vasudevan, Actor
 Hari Krishnan, Actor
 Saai Gayathri, Serial Actress
 Mohammed Azeem, Serial Actor
 VJ Nikki, Video Jockey
 Vaishali Thaniga, Serial Actress

References

External links 
 The Hindu
 Golden Moment for DG Vaishnav

Arts and Science colleges in Chennai
Colleges affiliated to University of Madras
Universities and colleges in Chennai
1964 establishments in Madras State
Educational institutions established in 1964